Reijo Kuistila (23 September 1931 – 20 January 2020) was a Finnish equestrian. He competed in two events at the 1956 Summer Olympics.

References

External links
 

1931 births
2020 deaths
Finnish male equestrians
Olympic equestrians of Finland
Equestrians at the 1956 Summer Olympics
People from Hämeenlinna
Sportspeople from Kanta-Häme